The United States Navy Net Depot Tiburon was a military facility charged with maintaining and deploying an anti-submarine net across the Golden Gate between San Francisco and Marin County during World War II.

References

External links
 Naval Net Depot, Tiburon, California Military History Online

Anti-submarine warfare